South Ripley High School is a public high school located just southeast of Versailles, Indiana (USA). It is part of the South Ripley Community School Corporation which covers four townships:  Brown, Johnson, Otter Creek and Shelby in southern Ripley County.  In 1966, four smaller high schools in Cross Plains, Holton, New Marion and Versailles consolidated to form South Ripley High School.

Demographics
The demographic breakdown of the 365 students enrolled for the 2012–2013 school year was:
Male - 52.9%
Female - 47.1%
Native American/Alaskan - 0.0%
Asian/Pacific islander - 0.3%
Black - 0.0%
Hispanic - 1.0%
White - 98.4%
Multiracial - 0.3%

Additionally, 41.1% of the students were eligible for free or reduced lunches.

Athletics
The South Ripley Raiders compete in the Ohio River Valley Conference. The following IHSAA sanctioned sports are offered:

Baseball (boys)
Basketball (girls & boys)
Cross country (girls & boys)
Golf (girls & boys)
Soccer (girls & boys)
Softball (girls)
Swimming (girls & boys)
Track (girls & boys)
Volleyball (girls)

See also
 List of high schools in Indiana

References

External links
 

Public high schools in Indiana
Public middle schools in Indiana
Education in Ripley County, Indiana